Anubha Sourya Sarangi is an Indian actress and model who is known for her work in the Ollywood industry.

Career
Anubha began her career as a child artist. She became a professional actress with the movie Mun Premi Mun Pagala alongside Harihar Dash. She made her debut in Bollywood with the movie Kaun Kitne Paani Mein. She made her comeback in Ollywood after 5 years in 2016 and appeared in Samaya Bada Balaban (2016), Revenge (2016), and Sweet Heart (2016) opposite Babushan Mohanty.

In 2018, she appeared against Jyoti Ranjan Nayak in the movie Saathi Tu Pheria.

Filmography

References

Actresses from Bhubaneswar
Living people
Actresses in Odia cinema
Ollywood
21st-century Indian actresses
Year of birth missing (living people)